The Rockets–Spurs rivalry is an NBA rivalry between the Houston Rockets and the San Antonio Spurs. It is also known as the I-10 Rivalry since San Antonio and Houston lie on Interstate 10, it is one of the three National Basketball Association rivalries between teams from Texas, the others featuring Houston and San Antonio versus the Dallas Mavericks.

Background
The rivalry began in 1976 when the Spurs moved from the American Basketball Association along with the Denver Nuggets, New York Nets, and Indiana Pacers. The Rockets and Spurs competed for the division title, with the Rockets winning it first in 1977 and the Spurs in 1978 and 1979. In 1980, they met in the playoffs for the first time as the Rockets led by Moses Malone and Calvin Murphy beat the Spurs led by George Gervin and James Silas 2–1. The rivalry grew intense as both teams moved from the East to the West. They met again in 1981, this time in the second round. The Spurs had home-court advantage, and were heavily favored, winning the Midwest Division Title and the Rockets only 40–42. The Rockets and Spurs fought to the bitter end before the Rockets held on to win Game 7 capped by Murphy's 42 points. The Rockets would advance to the Finals in a losing cause to the Boston Celtics. The rivalry sparkled in 1995 when the sixth-seeded Rockets led by Hakeem Olajuwon beat the top-seeded Spurs led by MVP David Robinson.

Even after Olajuwon was traded to the Toronto Raptors in 2001, he recalled the fond memories he had of playing against his old San Antonio rival.

Notable games

1981 NBA Playoffs
In a classic Game 7, the 40–42 Rockets looked to upset the 52–30 Spurs to advance to the Western Conference Finals. Capped by Calvin Murphy's 42 points, the Rockets defeated the Spurs to advance to the Conference Finals and defeated the likewise 40–42 Kansas City Kings, and moved on to the 1981 NBA Finals where they were defeated by the Celtics. The Spurs waited another 18 years to see a Finals berth and Title.

1995 Playoffs

In 1995, the Rockets looked to win their second straight NBA championship. Despite a slow start, the 6th-seeded Rockets (47–35) managed to get through their first opponent, the 3rd-seeded Utah Jazz (60–22) 3–2, and the 2nd-seeded Phoenix Suns (59–23) 4–3. The Rockets would encounter the top seeded Spurs waiting (62–20) for them in the Conference Finals. The Spurs had swept their first round opponent, the Denver Nuggets (41–41) before defeating the Los Angeles Lakers (48–34) in 6 games.

Olajuwon displayed perhaps the most impressive moments of his career when the Rockets faced the San Antonio Spurs in the Conference Finals. Recently crowned league MVP Robinson was outplayed by Olajuwon, 35–24 PPG. When asked later what a team could do to "solve" Olajuwon, Robinson told LIFE magazine: "Hakeem? You don't solve Hakeem." The Rockets won every road game that series and beat the Spurs 4–2. The Rockets swept the Orlando Magic in the 1995 NBA Finals 4–0, and secured their second Championship. Thus far, the Rockets had won a division title, conference title and Championship before their rivals.

2004 Rockets comeback
It took place on December 9, 2004, after a long fought game in which the Spurs had mostly led (up by 10 points under a minute left) and the Rockets crowd beginning to boo their own team; Tracy McGrady scored 13 points in 35 seconds, including a 3 with 1.7 seconds left to give the Rockets an 81–80 comeback win. The game ended a 7-game losing streak against the Spurs for Houston.

2008 Spurs comeback
In 2008, the teams would meet for the first match on November 14 at the AT&T Center in San Antonio. The Spurs began the 2008 season with their worst record in franchise history (2–4), as a result of an injury to Manu Ginóbili at the 2008 Summer Olympics, and a sprained ankle to Tony Parker early in the season. This was the first regular season game in which the newly acquired Ron Artest along with Tracy McGrady and Yao Ming would face San Antonio. The Rockets led most of the game, going up by as many as 14 with 7 minutes left. Despite missing more than 40 points in scoring from their two injured guards, two time MVP Tim Duncan (22 pts) and rookie George Hill (17 pts) led the Spurs' comeback. They finally took the lead (76–75) with 59 seconds left on a hook shot by Duncan. He blocked a layup that would have given the Rockets the lead with less than 2 seconds left. After the Spurs made 1 of 2 free throws, the Rockets got one last chance to win, but Artest missed a 3 as time expired, giving San Antonio a 77–75 victory.

2017 Playoffs
The Spurs entered the 2017 NBA playoffs as the second seeded Western Conference team after securing a 61–21 record, their second straight 60+ win season and 20th consecutive postseason appearance. The Spurs dispatched their first round opponent, the Memphis Grizzlies, in six games.

The Rockets entered the playoffs as the third seeded Western Conference team after securing a 55–27 record, a significant improvement over their 41–41 eighth-place finish the previous season. They were led by the 2016-2017 Coach of the Year, Mike D'Antoni. Under D'Antoni, the Rockets set the NBA record for most 3-pointers made in a single season with 1,181. In the first round, the Rockets defeated the Oklahoma City Thunder in five games.

The Spurs and Rockets met in the Western Conference Semifinals. The match-up was the first between the two teams in the playoffs since the 1995 Western Conference Finals. In Game 1, the Rockets defeated the Spurs in a blowout, 126–99. In Game 2 of the series, the Spurs returned the favor with a 121–96 victory. However, the Spurs lost starting point guard Tony Parker indefinitely with a ruptured left quadriceps tendon. The teams split games 3 (Spurs) and 4 (Rockets), evening the series at 2 games apiece.  In Game 5 of the series, all-star Spurs small forward Kawhi Leonard suffered an injury to his right ankle in the third quarter, which would eventually result in him sitting out for the closing portions of the game. The game was tightly contest throughout, with both teams failing to capitalize on opportunities to take the lead at the end of regulation.  In the overtime period, Manu Ginóbili blocked James Harden's three-point attempt in the final seconds to secure the 110–107 victory for the Spurs. The Spurs would close out the series in a Game 6 blowout, 114–75. The 75 points were the lowest point total of the season for the Rockets. The Rockets, known throughout the season for their prolific offense, were held to less than 100 points three times in the series after being held below 100 only five times in the regular season.

Annual results

NBA Playoffs

1980 Eastern Conference first round
 Game 1: Houston Rockets 95–85 San Antonio Spurs
 Game 2: San Antonio Spurs 106–101 Houston Rockets
 Game 3: Houston Rockets 141–120 San Antonio Spurs

Houston Rockets win series 2–1.

1981 Western Conference semifinals
 Game 1: San Antonio Spurs 98–107 Houston Rockets
 Game 2: San Antonio Spurs 125–113 Houston Rockets
 Game 3: Houston Rockets 112–99 San Antonio Spurs
 Game 4: Houston Rockets 112–114 San Antonio Spurs
 Game 5: San Antonio Spurs 117–123 Houston Rockets
 Game 6: Houston Rockets 96–101 San Antonio Spurs
 Game 7: San Antonio Spurs 100–105 Houston Rockets

Houston Rockets win series 4–3.

1995 Western Conference finals
 Game 1: San Antonio Spurs 93–94 Houston Rockets
 Game 2: San Antonio Spurs 96–106 Houston Rockets
 Game 3: Houston Rockets 102–107 San Antonio Spurs
 Game 4: Houston Rockets 81–103 San Antonio Spurs
 Game 5: San Antonio Spurs 90–111 Houston Rockets
 Game 6: Houston Rockets 100–95 San Antonio Spurs

Houston Rockets win series 4–2.

2017 Western Conference semifinals
 Game 1: San Antonio Spurs 99–126 Houston Rockets
 Game 2: San Antonio Spurs 121–96 Houston Rockets
 Game 3: Houston Rockets 92–103 San Antonio Spurs
 Game 4: Houston Rockets 125–104 San Antonio Spurs
 Game 5: San Antonio Spurs 110–107 Houston Rockets
 Game 6: Houston Rockets 75–114 San Antonio Spurs

San Antonio Spurs win series 4–2.

References

National Basketball Association rivalries
Houston Rockets
San Antonio Spurs
1976 establishments in Texas